Les Warner (also known as Lez Warner) is a British born musician and producer, primarily a drummer best known for his work with The Cult. He currently resides in Las Vegas, Nevada and performs at the New York-New York Hotel & Casino as part of the Celtic Rockers.

Les is currently playing drums with Godmother of Soul, a Las Vegas-based band featuring Tomi Rae Brown (widow of singer, James Brown), bassist Kelly Garni (founding member of Quiet Riot), guitarist Raven Storm, and Jason Edwards on keyboards.

Les also currently plays bass for the Las Vegas- based all-star tribute band, Petty and the Heartshakers.

Early years
Born and raised in the Fulham area of London, Warner's dream was to follow in the footsteps of Thin Lizzy's Brian Downey. He bought his first drum kit at age 13, and first performed live in a high school production of Joseph and the Amazing Technicolor Dreamcoat. He continued playing drums into the 1970s, playing with several bands at a time, and became a drum legend of London's club scene. When punk rock exploded in 1976, his steamhammer style—described as Stewart Copeland's handiwork and John Bonham's pedal power—was perfect for punk and versatile enough for other musical styles, and Warner did sessions with everyone from Sham 69, Here and Now, Johnny Thunders to The Waterboys and Julian Lennon.

The Cult
In 1985, The Cult were looking for a new drummer. After auditioning 100 young hopefuls and experienced veterans, they called Les, and he became the drummer for the Cult on their Electric album (after performing on The Cult's abandoned "Peace" record) and toured the world in support of both the Love and Electric albums, appearing on Saturday Night Live, Joan Rivers Show, Top of the Pops and a host of other television shows around the globe. After finishing The Cult's tour in December 1987, Warner was fired from The Cult in 1988, and later pursued his own projects and spent time in Africa playing and learning native rhythms, fusing them with his own style, and indulging his photography habit.

Post Cult 
Back in London, Warner formed a band called The Hellfire Club with lifelong friend Paul Raven, Killing Joke and Prong bassist. In 1991, Warner relocated to New York City and announced his arrival with a guest appearance during a "Spinal Tap" performance at the Beacon Theatre. He went on to jam with Steve Stevens, Joe Lynn Turner, members of Bob Dylan's band and others.

In New York, Warner expanded his repertoire to commercial soundtracks, drumming on the Sega Genesis Mortal Kombat TV theme, a Miller Lite TV and radio campaign, and numerous other commercials. From 1995 to 1996 he was a member of Harry Slash & The Slashtones and the short-lived New York band The Horsemen. During the late '90s, Warner found himself maintaining dual-residency in both the London and New York music scenes as a session drummer. He continued his contributions to Ten Wings Music through his work with Motorbaby, and began working with up-and-coming New York rock band Queen V on Skyhigh Records.

In early 2002, Warner went on to expand his musical horizons when he joined the traditional Irish group, The McCabes. The McCabes breed of blistering Irish jibs and reels allowed Warner to experiment with new dimensions of sound and style, broadening his array of already accomplished and varied chops. The band performed on the popular Irish circuit of summer festivals, including a performance at Shea Stadium. Warner's performance with The McCabes was captured on their limited edition live release, The McCabes at Paddy Reilly's.

With the McCabes at Shea Stadium The McCabes - Paddy Reilly's Warner continues to work in L.A., New York, and London hammering down tracks for various recording artists. He has also established a studio near his home in Las Vegas, creating a comfortable recording environment for the performers in his production company, US-UK Music West Coast. His latest work can be found on Downtown Recording's production of the new Nickie Seven album.

As of early September, 2012, Godmother of Soul was finishing up a promotional video and was beginning to book shows.  GMOS plays a wide variety of high-powered rock and soul songs including an entire set of Janis Joplin, and several James Brown classics, along with original material.

References

External links
 Lez Warner Interview With Michael Stephens

English rock drummers
Living people
The Cult members
Year of birth missing (living people)